The vestibulo-oculomotor fibers are the portion of the medial longitudinal fasciculus which ascends to the oculomotor nucleus from the vestibular nuclei.

See also
 Vestibulo-ocular reflex

Central nervous system pathways
Brainstem